Riveresque (styled as riveresque) is the ninth studio album by Australian folk rockers, Weddings Parties Anything. It was released in September 1996 with band members co-producing alongside Cameron Craig and Dylan Hughes. It peaked at No. 34 on the ARIA Albums Chart. According to the inlay card: "Riverésque after the style of a river winding, flowing towards the sea, meandering."

It is the first album on their new record label, Mushroom Records, and was initially distributed by Festival Records. After Mushroom's CEO Michael Gudinski dropped Festival as their distributor he took up with Sony Music Australia.

Re-release pressings of riveresque were issued in October 1997 and feature a different sleeve. It includes a bonus nine-track CD, Garage Sale, which was also available separately at their live performances during 1997. The bonus CD has three cover versions: Tim Hardin's "Reason to Believe", Susanna Clark and Richard Leigh's "From the Heart", and Ewan MacColl's "Sweet Thames Flow Softly".

Reception 

Australian musicologist, Ian McFarlane, felt that riveresque was "another top-notch release, mixing storming rockers with pristine ballads. Anderson's gypsy violin also served to flesh out the band's honest and direct songs." Aaron Badgley of AllMusic opined that "the band has their trademark sound, mostly due to Michael Thomas's impassioned vocals, but there seemed to be a new energy in this release. In particular, Jen Anderson's violin playing seems more in the foreground, producing a very melancholy sound to the typically sad songs of regrets, lost loves, unrequited loves, and the struggles of being musicians. The sound on this CD leans more toward alternative country than folk, but it works incredibly well." While the bonus disc, Garage Sale, "features a much looser sound, and three cover versions... Overall a pleasant CD, but it does not live up to River'esque, and sounds more like outtakes or B-sides. Fun for fans, but not much of an interest to the casual listener."

Track listing

Personnel

Credited to:

Weddings Parties Anything
 Jen Anderson – violin, mandolin, vocals
 Michael Barclay – drums, vocals
 Stephen O'Prey – bass guitar, vocals
 Mick Thomas – guitar, mandolin, vocals
 Paul Thomas – guitar, pedal steel, vocals
 Mark Wallace – accordion, keyboards, vocals

Additional musicians
 Lou Bennett – vocals
 Anna Burley – vocals
 Sally Dastey – vocals

Production work
 Producer – Cameron Craig, Dylan Hughes, Wedding Parties Anything
 Mixer – Cameron Craig, Doug Roberts

Art work
 Photography – Jen Anderson, Mick Thomas

Charts

References

1994 albums
Weddings Parties Anything albums